Jefferson Davis Parish is a parish located in the U.S. state of Louisiana. As of the 2020 census, the population was 32,250. The parish seat is Jennings. Jefferson Davis Parish is named after the president of the Confederacy during the American Civil War, Jefferson Davis. It is located in southwestern Louisiana and forms a part of the Acadiana region.

In 2005, the parish was damaged significantly by Hurricane Rita, which caused much wind damage and flooding in the western part of the parish. The storm also caused Lacassine National Wildlife Refuge to be affected by saltwater intrusion.

History
Jefferson Davis Parish was one of the last parishes to be organized in the state of Louisiana. It was originally a part of Imperial Calcasieu Parish, which contributed to five other parishes as the population increased in the area. The bill creating Jefferson Davis Parish was passed by the state legislature in 1912 but did not take effect until 1913. Jefferson Davis Parish is part of the large, 22-county Acadiana region of Louisiana, which is influenced by a large Francophone population. It was named after Jefferson Davis, a prominent planter and the President of the Confederate States of America.

The first oil in Louisiana was drilled in 1901 in Evangeline, Acadia Parish, by W. Scott Heywood, who in 1932 was elected to the Louisiana State Senate. The oil field was known as the Jennings Oil Field because Jennings was the nearest railroad stop to the oil field.

Geography

Jefferson Davis Parish comprises five incorporated towns including Elton, Fenton, Jennings, Lake Arthur, and Welsh. There are also many unincorporated areas that add to the interest and economic structure of the parish including Barnsdall, Buller, China, Coverdale, Edna, Fontenot, Foreman's Hall, Hathaway, Illinois Plant, Lacassine, Lauderdale, Panchoville, Pine Island, Raymond, Roanoke, Silverwood, Thornwell, Topsy, Verret, and Woodlawn. Interstate 10 runs east and west through the center of the parish, providing access to local markets. Additionally, the Union Pacific Railroad is centrally located within the parish and the Mermentau River, which connects to the Intracoastal Waterway and has a channel depth of nine feet, provides access to the Port of Mermentau. Jefferson Davis Parish also attracts sportsmen to the Lacassine National Wildlife Refuge.

Adjacent parishes
 Allen Parish  (north)
 Evangeline Parish  (northeast)
 Acadia Parish  (east)
 Vermilion Parish  (southeast)
 Cameron Parish  (south)
 Calcasieu Parish  (west)
 Beauregard Parish  (northwest)

Transportation

Major highways

  Interstate 10
  U.S. Highway 90
  U.S. Highway 165
  Louisiana Highway 14
  Louisiana Highway 26
  Louisiana Highway 97
  Louisiana Highway 99
  Louisiana Highway 101
  Louisiana Highway 102
  Louisiana Highway 380
  Louisiana Highway 382
  Louisiana Highway 395
  Louisiana Highway 1130

Airports
 Jennings, (3R7)
 Welsh

Communities

City 
 Jennings (parish seat and largest municipality)

Towns
 Elton
 Lake Arthur
 Welsh

Village
 Fenton

Unincorporated areas

Census-designated places 
 Hathaway
 Lacassine
 Roanoke

Unincorporated communities 

 Barnsdall
 Buller
 China
 Coverdale
 Edna
 Fontenot
 Foreman's Hall
 Gravel Point
 Lauderdale
 Niblett
 Panchoville
 Pine Island
 Raymond
 Silverwood
 Soileau
 Thornwell
 Topsy
 Verrett
 Woodlawn

Demographics

As of the 2020 United States census, there were 32,250 people, 11,726 households, and 8,149 families residing in the parish.

Education
Jefferson Davis Parish Public Schools operates the schools in the parish.
 Elton Elementary School (Grades PK-5) (Elton)
 Elton High School (Grades 6-12) (Elton)
 Fenton Elementary School (Grades PK-8) (Fenton)
 Hathaway High School (Grades K-12) (Jennings)
 Jennings Elementary School (Grades 3-6) (Jennings)
 Jennings High School (Grades 7-12) (Jennings)
 Lacassine High School (Grades K-12) (Lacassine)
 Lake Arthur Elementary School (Grades PK-6) (Lake Arthur)
 Lake Arthur High School (Grades 7-12) (Lake Arthur)
 James Ward Elementary School (Grades PK-2) (Jennings)
 Welsh Elementary School (Grades PK-5) (Welsh)
 Welsh High School (Grades 8-12) (Welsh)
 Welsh-Roanoke Jr. High School (Grades 6-8) (Roanoke)

Jeff Davis Parish is served by the Roman Catholic Diocese of Lafayette which has one school in the parish:
 Our Lady Immaculate (Grades PK-8) (Jennings)

Jeff Davis Parish is served by one institution of higher education:
 It is in the service area of Sowela Technical Community College. The Morgan Smith campus is located in Jennings.

National Guard
C Company 3-156TH Infantry Battalion resides in Jennings, Louisiana.  This unit as part of the 256th IBCT deployed twice to Iraq in 2004—5 and 2010.

Notable people
 A.C. Clemons (1921-1992), former Louisiana state senator from 1960–72
 Al Woods (born 1987), current American football player for the Seattle Seahawks of the NFL
 Thomas A. "Tom" Greene (born 1948), former Louisiana state senator from 1992-2000
 Travis Etienne (born 1999), current American football player for the Jacksonville Jaguars of the NFL
 Cleve Francis (born 1945), country music singer, songwriter, and cardiologist
 Monte Ledbetter (1943-2020), former American football player in the NFL
 Eugene John Hebert (1923-1990), priest and Jesuit missionary who famously disappeared in Sri Lanka in 1990 during the Sri Lankan civil war
 Canray Fontenot (1922-1995), American Creole musician
 Charles Mann (born 1944), singer and swamp pop performer and member of the Louisiana Music Hall of Fame
 Jack Doland (1928-1991), former head football coach, athletic director, and president of McNeese State University and Louisiana state senator
 Chancy Croft (born 1937), former Democrat politician from Alaska
 Avalon Daggett (1907-2002), filmmaker and philanthropist
 June James (1962-1990), former American football player in the NFL and CFL
 Pat Rapp (born 1967), former professional baseball player
 Guy Sockrider (1921-2011), former Louisiana state senator
 Donald Ellsworth Walter (born 1936), former United States district judge of the United States District Court for the Western District of Louisiana
 Phillip Walker (1937-2010), musician
 Troy Romero, current Louisiana State Representative from the 37th district

Politics

See also
 Jeff Davis 8 string of unsolved murders
 National Register of Historic Places listings in Jefferson Davis Parish, Louisiana

References

External links
 Jefferson Davis Parish Sheriff's Office
 Jefferson Davis Parish Economic Development & Tourist Commission

Geology
 Heinrich, P. V., J. Snead, and R. P. McCulloh, 2002, Lake Charles 30 x 60 minute geologic quadrangle. Louisiana Geological Survey, Baton Rouge, Louisiana.
 Heinrich, P. V., J. Snead, and R. P. McCulloh, 2003, Crowley 30 x 60 minute geologic quadrangle. Louisiana Geological Survey, Baton Rouge, Louisiana.

Hydrology
 Water Resources of Jefferson Davis Parish, Louisiana United States Geological Survey.

 
Louisiana parishes
Parishes in Acadiana
Acadiana
1913 establishments in Louisiana
Populated places established in 1913